Joseph Paul Sindelar (born March 30, 1958) is an American professional golfer who currently plays on the PGA Tour Champions. He previously played on the PGA Tour, winning seven tournaments between 1985 and 2004.

Early life
Sindelar was born in Fort Knox, Kentucky, while his father served in the Army, but he lived in Horseheads, New York, for most of his life. He was a childhood friend and high school golf rival of fellow PGA Tour player Mike Hulbert.

College career
Sindelar attended Ohio State University in Columbus, Ohio, where he was a distinguished member of the school's golf team. He was a three-time All-American, a member of the 1979 NCAA Championship team, and Ohio State's Athlete of the Year in 1981. Sindelar was inducted into the Ohio State Varsity O Hall of Fame in 1992.

Professional career
Sindelar turned pro in 1981. He won seven PGA Tour events and was one of the most consistent players on the tour, with more than 80 top-10 finishes in his career. Sindelar had ten top-10 finishes in 1988, including victories at The Honda Classic and The International. He played on the 1991 World Cup team. His best finish in a major was T6 at the 1992 U.S. Open. Sindelar scored a double eagle at the 2006 PGA Championship, which was only the third time such a score had been recorded in that competition's history. 

Since turning 50 years old in 2008, he has played on the PGA Tour Champions. Sindelar has over 30 top-10 finishes on the senior tour, including four second-place finishes with a playoff loss at the 2010 Liberty Mutual Legends of Golf.

Personal Life

Sindelar currently resides in Lansing, New York. His son, Jamie, is also a professional golfer and serves as Director of Golf at RaNic Golf Club in nearby Ithaca.

Amateur wins
1971 New York State Boys
1980 New York State Amateur

Professional wins (9)

PGA Tour wins (7)

PGA Tour playoff record (2–1)

Other wins (2)
1983 New York State Open (as an amateur)
1989 Fred Meyer Challenge (with Craig Stadler)

Playoff record
PGA Tour Champions playoff record (0–1)

Results in major championships

CUT = missed the half-way cut
WD = withdrew
"T" = tied

Summary

Most consecutive cuts made – 5 (1991 Masters – 1993 Masters)
Longest streak of top-10s – 1 (twice)

Results in The Players Championship

CUT = missed the halfway cut
"T" indicates a tie for a place

Results in World Golf Championships

"T" = Tied

U.S. national team appearances
Professional
Kirin Cup: 1988 (winners)
World Cup: 1991

See also
1983 PGA Tour Qualifying School graduates
List of golfers with most PGA Tour wins

References

External links

American male golfers
PGA Tour golfers
PGA Tour Champions golfers
Ohio State Buckeyes men's golfers
Golfers from Kentucky
Golfers from New York (state)
People from Horseheads, New York
Horseheads High School alumni
1958 births
Living people